Radio Rosestad 100.6 FM (City of Roses) is a South African community-based radio station based in Bloemfontein, South Africa of the Free State.

Formed in 1994 as Radio Vryheid, it subsequently changed its name to Radio Rosestad. It mainly broadcasts for the Boer-Afrikaner community on 100.6 FM.

Coverage areas 
From its Bloemfontein studio, it reaches: 
Boshof
Winburg
Petrusburg
Bultfontein
Theunissen
Brandfort
Reddersburg
Edenburg
Dewetsdorp
Thaba Nchu
Touches Hertzogville & Virginia

Broadcast languages
Afrikaans

Broadcast time
24/7

Target audience
Afrikaans-speaking urban & farming communities in the central Free State
LSM Groups 6 - 10
Age Group 25 - 49

Programme format
60% Talk
40% Music

Listenership Figures

References

External links
 Official Website
 SAARF Website

Afrikaans-language radio stations
Community radio stations in South Africa
Mass media in the Free State (province)
Radio stations established in 1995
Radio stations in Bloemfontein